Friedrich Gorenstein (tr. ; 1932 – 2002) was a Ukrainian Jewish author and screenwriter. His works primarily deal with Stalinism, anti-Semitism, and the philosophical-religious view of a peaceful coexistence between Jews and Christians.

Biography 
Gorenstein was born in a family of Ukrainian Jews, his father, Naum Isaevich Gorenstein (1902—1937),  was a professor of political economy. His mother, Enna Abramovna Prilutskaya,  was an educator. During the Stalinist repressions,  his father was arrested in 1935 and sent to GULAG. He was shot in 1937 after trying to escape. He later regained his original name. His mother was the director of a home for juvenile offenders in Berdichev, Ukraine. During the Nazi invasion of 1941, he and his mother were evacuated to Orenburg in the Urals. His mother died of tuberculosis in 1943 in Orenburg. Friedrich was placed in an orphanage. After the war,  he was raised by his aunts, Zloty and Rachel,  in Berdichev.

Following World War II, Gorenstein struggled as an unskilled worker, until Nikita Khrushchev's De-Stalinization allowed him to return to Kiev. He studied mining in Dnipropetrovsk in the 1950s and worked as a miner and mining engineer in the Ural Mountains and Ukraine.

Gorenstein moved to Moscow in 1962 to complete his scenarist course at the State Film University. He began writing screenplays to support himself. Most of his adaptions were censored, but he managed to finish his works, including writing the script for the 1972 science fiction film Solaris, directed by Andrei Tarkovsky. He also wrote books, but none were published except "Дом с башенкой" (The House with the Tower; 1964).

In 1977 Gorenstein released his works through foreign emigration presses to bypass censorship. That and his membership in the forbidden writers union and Almanach Metropol by Vasily Aksyonov got him in trouble with the Soviet government. He received a scholarship from the German Academic Exchange Service and emigrated to Berlin in 1979, working there as a writer until his death in 2002. His novel Place was nominated for the 1992 Russian Booker Prize.

In 1995 he was a member of the jury at the 19th Moscow International Film Festival.

Themes
Gorenstein's themes reflect the repressive political life he witnessed in Communist Russia. He expressed his belief in a united, peaceful nation with conformity and without totalitarism and anti-Semitism. His work The House with the Tower has existentialist themes in the style of Franz Kafka, Albert Camus, and Jean-Paul Sartre. Other works move away from existentialism and incorporate religious themes, particularly Judaism. One example is Berdychev, which recounts the life of a Jew in the pre-WWII Ukraine.

Selected works

Filmography 
 1966: Первый учитель (The First Teacher)
 1972: Нечаянные радости (Unintentional Joy) (unfinished)
 1972: Solaris
 1974: The Seventh Bullet (1972 film)
 1975: Prisoners of Love
 1976: Раба любви (The Slave of Love)
 1978: Комедия ошибок (The Comedy of Errors) (TV)
 1985 (produced in 1991): Infanticide

External links

References

1932 births
2002 deaths
Writers from Kyiv
Dnipro Polytechnic alumni
Ukrainian Jews
Soviet emigrants to Germany
German people of Ukrainian-Jewish descent
German male screenwriters
Soviet screenwriters
Soviet male writers
German male writers
20th-century German screenwriters